Nagahamulla is a small locality in Pelawatte, Colombo, Sri Lanka.
It is also near the Parliament of Sri Lanka.

Famous For
Nagahamulla is famous for its Wetland Reserve and Bird Sanctuary.
New water reserve tank is also currently under construction.

Populated places in Western Province, Sri Lanka